Tungrovirus is a genus of viruses, in the family Caulimoviridae, order Ortervirales. Monocots and  family Poaceae serve as natural hosts. There is only one species in this genus: Rice tungro bacilliform virus. Diseases associated with this genus include: stunting, yellow to orange leaf discoloration with fewer tillers. Tungro means 'degenerated growth' in a Filipino dialect and the virus was first observed in the Philippines 1975.

Structure
Viruses in Tungrovirus are non-enveloped, with icosahedral and bacilliform geometries, and T=3 symmetry. Genomes are circular. The virus withstands temperatures below 63-degree Celsius for 10 minutes. The tungro virus is known to have at least two strains - S and M. The 'S' strain in these varieties produces conspicuous interveinal chlorosis, giving an appearance of yellow stripe and sometimes irregular chlorotic specks on younger leaves. On the other hand, the 'M' strain produces only mottling.

Life cycle
Viral replication is nuclear/cytoplasmic. Replication follows the dsDNA(RT) replication model. The method of transcription is dsDNA(RT) transcription. Translation takes place by leaky scanning, and  ribosomal shunting. The virus exits the host cell by nuclear pore export, and tubule-guided viral movement. Monocots and family poaceae serve as the natural host. The virus is transmitted via vectors such as aphids and leafhoppers (e.g. Nephotettix spp.).

Clinical
Tungro affected rice plants are stunted and have reduced numbers of tillers. The young emerging leaves develop interveinal chlorosis leading to discoloration of the leaves, starting from the tips downwards. Often the whole leaf is discolored. Plants infected at an early stage generally die prematurely. Infected plants take more time to mature because of delayed flowering. The panicles are often poorly developed and the grains are also often covered with dark brown blotches and are lighter weight than those of healthy plants.

After twelve days Tungro infection causes little damage, however there is extensive damage after one month. The severe syndrome known as Tungro disease is not caused by RTBV alone - this requires coinfection with Rice tungro spherical virus (RTSV).

ResistanceOryza officinalis'' in Sukhothai Province, Thailand was reported in 1990 to be highly resistant to tungro and already in use in several cultivars.

References

External links
 Viralzone: Tungrovirus
 Genus: Tungrovirus - Caulimoviridae - Reverse Transcribing DNA and RNA Viruses - International Committee on Taxonomy of Viruses (ICTV)

Caulimoviridae
Virus genera